Nawal El Kuwaitia (born Nawal Thaher Al-Zaid, 18 November 1966) is a Kuwaiti singer and actress.

Career
Nawal studied at the Music Institute in Kuwait.

Nawal's first album was released in 1984. The majority of her albums are not titled, but rather are referred to by number (e.g. Nawal 98, Nawal 99). She has also filmed many music videos (mainly in Lebanon) and was one of the first Khaliji artists to do so. 

After retiring from her singing career for personal reasons, Nawal returned after five years  with a duet performed with Abdullah Rashad, "Kan Widdi Niltiki" ("I Wished We Could Have Met").

Discography

Albums
 Nawal (1984)
 Nawal (1985)
 Nawal 1986
 Nawal 1988
 Nawal 1989
 Nawal 1994
 Wainek 7abeeby (1995)
 Tadri (1996)
 Nawal 1998
 Nawal 2000
 Nawal 2002
 Nawal 2004
 Nawal 2006
Nawal (2009)
Nawal (2013)
Nawal (2016)
El Haneen (2020)

Singles
 "Kan Widdi Niltiki" 1994 (duet with Abdullah Rashad)
 "Allah Haseebak" 2000
 "Taab Qalbi" 2000
 "Ahawel" 2001 (duet with Fadl Shaker)
 "El Shoq Jabek" 2002
 "Biyehsidouni Aleeh" 2004
 "Othorini" 2005 (duet with Abdallah Al Rowaished)
 "Habeebat Galbi" 2007(duet with Abdallah Al Rowaished)
 "Yemer Esmik Ala Lsani" 2009 (duet with Abdallah Al Rowaished)

Music videos (Incomplete List)
 "Ana Min Shouktak" ("I Am the One Who Excited You")
 "Dourobi" ("My Paths")
 "Sineen wa Ayam" ("Years and Days")
 "Arafat Kadri" ("I Knew My Fate")
 "Marra Aateek" ("Once I Give You")
 "Lawla Al Mahabba" ("Had it Not Been for Affection")
 "Tadri" ("You Know")
 "Ana Walla Ant" ("Is It Me or You)
 "La Rihit Anni" ("If You Go Away")
 "Ya Msabbir Il Mwuoud" ("You Who Hold Promises")
 "Lesh" ("Why")

References

External links

Kuwaiti women singers
1966 births
Living people
Rotana Records artists
Kuwaiti people of Iraqi descent
Kuwaiti film actresses
Kuwaiti television actresses